Narasanayagipuram is a village in the Thanjavur taluk of Thanjavur district, Tamil Nadu, India.

Demographics 

As per the 2001 census, Narasanayagipuram had a total population of 1769 with 856 males and 913 females. The sex ratio was 1067. The literacy rate was 63.56.

References 

Villages in Thanjavur district